The Silver Swallows is the name of Irish Air Corps Aerobatic Team. Active from 1986 to 1998 and reformed in 2022. The team was originally equipped with four Fouga CM170 Magister jet trainers, and was drawn from the Light Strike Squadron of the Irish Air Corps based at Casement Aerodrome, Baldonnel near Dublin. It now uses the Pilatus PC-9M The name Silver Swallows was derived from the colour of the aircraft, and the 'V'-shaped tail of the Magister aircraft the team flew. Throughout its history the team was operated on a part-time basis, with the display duties of the team being secondary to the primary roles of the Light Strike Squadron.

Display history
This four-ship team first performed for the 60th anniversary of the formation of the Air Corps in 1982 with silver Fouga Magister trainers with a display designed to keep the team as close as possible to the crowd, and incorporated the concept of breaking up and reforming while flying aerobatic manoeuvres. The team performed its first formation loop at the Air Spectacular at Fairyhouse in 1983.
Formation aerobatics was continued in 1985 and 1986. The Silver Swallows were named during the Air Spectacular held at Baldonnel in August 1987. This same event saw the team again use a fourth Magister.

The team made few appearances outside their own country during its existence, their first overseas display being carried out at the RAF Brawdy Open Day on 26 July 1990. Their next overseas displays didn't take place until 1997, when the team visited a number of airshows in the UK and Belgium to commemorate the Irish Air Corps' 75th anniversary.
They appeared at the Royal International Air Tattoo at RAF Fairford in Gloucestershire, in 1997, where the team was awarded the prestigious Lockheed Martin Cannestra Trophy for the Best Display by an Overseas Performer.

In 1998 the team was disbanded owing to the retirement of the Fouga Magister from Irish Air Corps service.

In 2022 the Silver Swallows returned operating 4 Pilatus PC-9M's out of the Air Corps College, Flying Training School. The pilots are selected from the instructional staff; and are currently the Officer Commanding FTS, the Chief Flying Instructor, the Chief Ground Instructor and the Chief Simulator Instructor. Their first public experience was on the 10 July 2022 for the National Day of Commemoration in Collins barracks Dublin performing a flypast on the last notes of the Irish National Anthem. The first full display was the 2022 Royal International Air Tattoo at RAF Fairford - performing a half-hour four-ship display, also performing at the Bray International Air Display later that month.

External links
Air Corps section of the Irish Defence Forces website
Cockpit video of Silver Swallows formation flying

Aerobatic teams
Irish Air Corps
1986 establishments in Ireland
1998 disestablishments in Ireland
Military units and formations of the Republic of Ireland